X-rays are a form of electromagnetic radiation or radiographs: photographs made with X-rays.

X-ray or Xray may also refer to:

Arts and entertainment
 X-Ray (ballet), a 1994 ballet by Peter Martins, set to John Adams's Violin Concerto
 X-Ray (book), a 1994 "unauthorized autobiography" by Ray Davies of the Kinks
 X-ray (chess), a chess tactic
 X-Ray (film) or Hospital Massacre, a 1982 slasher film
 "X-Ray" (song), by Camouflage, 1996
 X-Ray (television), consumer programme produced by BBC Cymru Wales
 X-ray art, a traditional style of Aboriginal Australian painting; see 
 "X-Ray", a song by Left Spine Down from Caution
 X-Ray, a member of the hip hop collective Monsta Island Czars

Fictional entities
 X-Ray (comics), a fictional character appearing in material published by Marvel Comics
 X-Ray, a character from the novel Holes
 X-ray vision, the fictional ability of a character to see through outer layers of objects or clothing on people

Computing
 X-Ray (Amazon Kindle), a reference tool incorporated in Amazon Kindle e-readers
 X-Ray Engine, a graphics engine used in S.T.A.L.K.E.R. videogame series
 Instruments (software), a performance visualizer built into Mac OS X v10.5, formerly called Xray

Military
 Landing Zone X-Ray, a landing zone in the Battle of Ia Drang
 X-Ray, a code name for an event of Operation Sandstone, a nuclear weapon test series conducted by the US in April 1948

Other uses
 X-Ray, the letter X in the NATO phonetic alphabet
 XRAY Model Racing Cars, Slovakian radio controlled cars; See List of model car brands
 Dentsply Sirona stock ticker

See also
 The Lady with the X-Ray Eyes (1934), an absurdist fiction novel by Svetoslav Minkov